Can't Stop Won't Stop: A History of the Hip-Hop Generation is a 2005 book by Jeff Chang chronicling the early hip hop scene.

The book features portraits of DJ Kool Herc, Afrika Bambaataa, Chuck D, and Ice Cube, among others, and is based on numerous interviews with graffiti artists, gang members, DJs, rappers, and hip hop activists. DJ Kool Herc wrote the introduction.

Reception
The book was well received, winning an American Book Award in 2005. On Metacritic, the book received an aggregate score of 81/100 from twelve reviews—indicating "universal acclaim".
LA Weekly praised the book as being "extensively researched and meticulously written" and The New Yorker described it as "one of the most urgent and passionate histories of popular music ever written".

The book was criticized for its focus on the political aspects. According to The New York Times, "Chang is interested in hip-hop as a revolutionary medium... [so] he more or less leaves music behind... as a result, his provocative, intermittently brilliant history begins to lose its form and focus," and "by the end of Chang's history, the four elements have fallen away entirely, and politics are all that remain to tie the hip-hop generation together." It was also criticized for leaving out key elements of hip-hop history - "if you want to read a long and unbelievably self-indulgent trawl through the internal politics of US hip-hop magazine The Source, then this is the place to do it. But Biggie Smalls and Missy Elliott get just one mention apiece, and Eminem is excluded from history altogether." says The Independent.

KRS-One’s criticism

In 2007, KRS-One criticized Can’t Stop Won’t Stop: "When I read Can’t Stop, Won’t Stop I didn’t see the scholarship. I saw Kool Herc thrown at the front of the book for his own credibility – and the foreword was wack." His main point of contention was with the way he himself was covered: "[Jeff Chang] gets around to the Stop The Violence movement and totally down-plays the movement, destroys any kind of hope we have for leadership in our culture, and just breezes over with inaccurate information about the Stop The Violence movement."

Jeff Chang responded: "Can’t Stop Won’t Stop was and is never meant to be the last word on anything. It’s meant to be a small contribution to the larger wave of thinking about the hip-hop generation."

Notes
Chang, Jeff (2005). Can't Stop Won't Stop: A History of the Hip-Hop Generation. Picador, .

References

External links
Official website
Review of Can’t Stop Won’t Stop on Beat Knowledge

Hip hop books
2005 non-fiction books
Picador (imprint) books
American Book Award-winning works